The Many is a 2016 novel by Wyl Menmuir. It follows the story of Timothy, a foreigner who buys an abandoned house in a coastal village. The book was longlisted for the 2016 Man Booker Prize.

Awards and honors
2016 Man Booker Prize, longlistee.

References

2016 British novels